A. N. Gopal was the second Indian President of the Protestant Andhra Evangelical Lutheran Church Society and served from 1951 to 1955.  On completion of his term, he was assigned the responsibility of president of the Lutheran Theological College, Rajahmundry.

Apart from his primary responsibility to the Andhra Evangelical Lutheran Church Society, he also served in an honorary capacity as president of the United Evangelical Lutheran Churches in India (formerly Federation of Evangelical Lutheran Churches in India).

In 1955 when Gopal successfully completed a term as president of the Andhra Evangelical Lutheran Church, he went on study leave to the Lutheran School of Theology at Chicago, where he underwent postgraduate studies in theology.  On his return, he was assigned to the Lutheran Theological College, Rajahmundry.

In 1963, Gopal accepted the position as principal of the Voorhees College (India) in Vellore, Tamil Nadu, the same college where Sarvepalli Radhakrishnan had once studied.

References

Further reading
 
 
 
 
 
 
 

Indian Lutherans
Indian Christian theologians
Translators of the Bible into Telugu
Telugu people
Christian clergy from Andhra Pradesh
20th-century Indian translators
Senate of Serampore College (University) alumni
Academic staff of the Senate of Serampore College (University)
Living people
Year of birth missing (living people)